Minuscule 8 (in the Gregory-Aland numbering), ε 164 (von Soden), is a Greek minuscule manuscript of the New Testament on parchment. It is dated palaeographically to the 11th century. The manuscript has complex contents. It has complex contents and full marginalia.

Description 

The codex contains the complete text of the four Gospels, on 199 parchment leaves. The text is written in two columns per page, 22 lines per page. The initial letters in red.

There is also a division according to the Ammonian Sections, with references to the Eusebian Canons.

It contains the Epistula ad Carpianum, the Eusebian Canon tables, prolegomena, pictures, lectionary markings at the margin (for liturgical use), Menologion, and Synaxarion.
The passages of John 5:3–4 and the Pericope Adulterae (John 7:53-8:11) are marked with an obelus.

Text 

The Greek text of the codex is a representative of the Byzantine text-type. Hermann von Soden classified it to the textual family Family Kx. Aland placed it in Category V.

According to the Claremont Profile Method it represents Kx in Luke 1, Luke 10, and Luke 20.

In John 1:29 it lacks ο Ιωαννης along with manuscripts Sinaiticus, Alexandrinus, Vaticanus, Cyprius, Campianus, Petropolitanus Purpureus, Vaticanus 354, Nanianus, Macedoniensis, Sangallensis, Koridethi, Petropolitanus, Athous Lavrensis, 045, 047, 0141, 9, 565, 1192;

History 

Formerly it belonged to Antonelli Petrucci, a secretary of Ferdinand I, king of Naples. Then to Fontainebleau. This codex was used by Robert Estienne in his Editio Regia (1550), in which was designated as ζ'. In result its readings became a part of the Textus Receptus.

It was examined by Wettstein, Scholz, and Gregory (in 1884). Scholz examined only Gospel of John. It was examined and described by Paulin Martin. C. R. Gregory saw the manuscript in 1884.

The codex is currently located at the Bibliothèque nationale de France (Gr. 49) in Paris.

See also 

 List of New Testament minuscules
 Textual criticism

References

External links 
 Grec 49 at the BnF

Greek New Testament minuscules
11th-century biblical manuscripts
Bibliothèque nationale de France collections